Percy Scown (13 July 1883 – 6 July 1966) was an Australian rules footballer who played with Geelong in the Victorian Football League (VFL).

Notes

External links 

1966 deaths
1883 births
Australian rules footballers from Victoria (Australia)
Geelong Football Club players